Empress Tá Thiên (1791–1807), born Hồ Thị Hoa (胡氏華), was the first wife of Nguyễn Phúc Kiểu (future Emperor Minh Mạng) and mother of Nguyễn Phúc Tuyền, future Emperor Thiệu Trị.

Life

Gia Long era
Hồ Thị Hoa was born in Bình An of Biên Hòa in November 1791. She was a daughter of Nguyễn lord Hồ Văn Bôi. At the age of 14, She married Nguyễn Phúc Đảm, later named Nguyễn Phúc Kiểu, the fourth son of Emperor Gia long. After marriage, she got the favor from Emperor Gia Long and Empress Thuận Thiên, because of her talent and virtue. Emperor Gia long gave her name Thực(實).

On June 15, 1807, She gave birth to the only son Nguyễn Phúc Tuyền, who is the future Emperor Thiệu Trị. However, she died 13 days after childbirth.

Minh Mang era
Nguyễn Phúc Kiểu began his reign since 1820 and became Emperor Minh Mạng.As his first consort,Hồ Thị Hoa was posthumously honoured as Thuận Đức chiêu nghi (順德昭儀) in the next year. And in 1836, she was posthumously honoured as Thuận Đức Thần phi (順德宸妃).

Thieu Tri era
Hồ Thị Hoa was honoured as Empress Tá Thiên by her son Nguyễn Phúc Tuyền, Emperor Thiệu Trị.
After her death, she was buried at Hiếu Đông Lăng, beside Emperor's tomb Hiếu Lăng.

Titles
Chiêu nghi／昭儀; (from June 1821)
Thần phi／宸妃; (from May 1836)
Tá Thiên Nhân Hoàng hậu (Empress Tá Thiên) ／佐天仁皇后; (from April 1841)

Issue
Nguyễn Phúc Tuyền, Emperor Thiệu Trị

References 

 Đại Nam thực lục, Episode 2, Book 1
 Đại Nam liệt truyện, tập 3, Chính biên Nhị thập, sách đã dẫn.

1791 births
1807 deaths
People from Huế
Nguyễn dynasty posthumous empresses
Deaths in childbirth